Eudaronia aperta is a species of sea snail, a marine gastropod mollusk unassigned in the superfamily Seguenzioidea.

Description

Distribution
European waters

References

aperta
Gastropods described in 1925